Folkteatern i Gävleborg or Gävle Folkteater (The Folk Theatre in Gävleborg or Gävle Folk Theatre) is a regional theatre, opened in 1983, located in Gävle, Gävleborg County, Sweden.

External links
Folkteatern i Gävleborg website

Gävle
Theatres in Sweden
Buildings and structures in Gävleborg County